Sabeena Syed is a Pakistani actress, model and former author. Syed started her acting career with television serials. Her debut show was Hum TV's romantic drama Yaqeen Ka Safar (2017). She made her film debut with a supporting role in Parwaaz Hai Junoon (2018). As an author, Syed has worked for Oxford University Press and The Express Tribune.

Early life 
Syed was born in Moscow and raised in Karachi. She did her O levels at St. Patrick's Girls High School and A levels at The Lyceum School. She further studied Communication design at the Indus Valley School of Art and Architecture.

Career 
She started her professional career as an author and worked for The Express Tribune, Brandsynario and Oxford University Press. She participated in opening of Gallery Art One62, exhibited at Impact II.

Filmography

Television

Telefilm

Film

Music video

References

External links 
 

21st-century Pakistani actresses
Living people
Actresses from Karachi
Pakistani film actresses
Pakistani television actresses
1997 births